The Queen's Award for Enterprise: Sustainable Development (Environmental Achievement) is awarded each year on 21 April by Queen Elizabeth II, along with the other two Queen's Awards for Enterprise categories.

2011 
The following organisations were awarded this year.

 Blue Skies Holdings of Pitsford, Northampton for fresh-cut fruit prepared at source so as to offer the freshest possible product to the consumer.
 Brighter Future Workshop of Skelmersdale, Lancashire for a training centre for young disabled people to recycle, service and repair mobility equipment.
 Brother Industries of Audenshaw, Manchester for continuous improvement, achievement and leadership in sustainable development.
 Lakehouse Contracts of Romford, Essex for Lakehouse Legacy - managing resources and relationships to ensure sustainability of business activities.
 Naturesave Policies t/a Naturesave Insurance of Totnes, Devon for ethical insurance cover for individuals, companies and the voluntary sector.
 easitNETWORK of Dorking, Surrey for easitNETWORK social enterprise scheme for promoting travel initiatives by more sustainable means of transport.
 Scottish Power of Glasgow for Sustainable development of Whitelee Windfarm for green energy.
 Seacourt Limited of Oxford for policy for reducing the environmental footprint of a printing company.
 Wates Group of Leatherhead, Surrey for the Wates Group approach to Corporate Responsibility.
 Yeo Valley Farms of Blagdon, Bristol for continuing support for sustainable organic British farming with core business activities.

2010 
The following organisations were awarded this year.

 Camira Fabrics of Mirfield, West Yorkshire for design and manufacture of contract textiles.
 Clinton Devon Estates of Budleigh Salterton, Devon for optimisation of resources in the management of a countryside business.
 Fairtrade Foundation of London for the licensing of the FAIRTRADE Mark and development and promotion of products sourced from the developing world.
 Gripple of Sheffield, South Yorkshire for hangers for mechanical and electrical services; wire joiners and tensioners for agricultural fencing and trellising.
 Radisson Blu Hotel, Edinburgh of Edinburgh, Scotland for its "Responsible Business Programme" encompassing environmental and social responsibility.
 Recycling Lives of Preston, Lancashire for waste management and recycling providing employment, accommodation and training for unemployed people.
 South West Lakes Trust of Launceston, Cornwall a combined environmental and recreation charity.
 Studio E Architects of London for introduction of sustainable principles to the built environment and for architectural practice.
 Triodos Bank of Bristol a sustainable bank working with organisations that have social, cultural and environmental benefits.
 The Venus Company of Totnes, Devon for beach catering and retail.

2009 
The following organisations were awarded this year.

 AESSEAL of Rotherham for environmental technology products.
 Avon Metals of Gloucester for their approach to management ‘20/20 vision’ initiative.
 Boss Design of Dudley, West Midlands for their business sustainability approach – ensuring sustainable futures.
 Environmental Construction Products (trading as Green Building Store) Golcar, Huddersfield Manufacture and supply of sustainable building products.
 Knowsley Development Trust (trading as North Mersey Business Centre) of Knowsley, Merseyside for facilitation of social, economic, environmental, community, transport and enterprise projects.
 Northumbrian Water of Pity Me, Durham for continued commitment to responsible business practice.
 RDC Witham of Essex for computer re-use and recycling.
 Scottish Seabird Centre of North Berwick, East Lothian for sustainable tourism inspiring people to appreciate and care for wildlife and the natural environment.
 Sustrans of Bristol for projects that enable people to choose to travel in ways that benefit their health and the environment.
 UPM-Kymmene (trading as Shotton Paper) of Deeside, Flintshire for product and business improvement in the manufacture of newsprint.

2008 
The following organisations were awarded this year.

 BT Group of London for sustainability entrepreneurship - changing mindsets from risk to opportunity.
 Berkeley Group Holdings of Cobham, Surrey for developer of residential-led mixed use sustainable developments on brownfield sites.
 Blue Skies Holdings of Pitsford, Northamptonshire for preparation of cut fresh fruit at source for maximum freshness.
 Greenham Common Community Trust of Newbury, Berkshire for their sustainable approach to New Greenham park.
 Green-Works of Wembley, Middlesex  for re-use, recycling and remanufacture of surplus office furniture.
 InterfaceFLOR of Halifax, West Yorkshire for ‘MISSION ZERO’ to eliminate any negative impact on the environment.
 Permanent Publications of Petersfield, Hampshire for multimedia materials providing inspiring information to enable people to live more sustainable lifestyles.
 Pureprint Group of Uckfield, East Sussex for ‘Pureprint’ environmental printing system.
 ScotAsh of Alloa, Clackmannanshire for development and production of sustainable construction materials from power station ash by-products.
 Shared Interest Society of Newcastle upon Tyne for ethical financial services using members’ investments to deliver a more just world.
 Utilicom of Crawley, West Sussex for generation and supply of sustainable energy over a localised distribution network.
 Wessex Water of Bath for their approach to management of sustainability and stakeholder engagement.

2007 
The following organisations were awarded this year.

 Benchmark Woodworking of Hungerford, Berkshire for design/manufacture of bespoke furniture and specialist joinery with demonstrable commitment to sustainable manufacturing.
 Bettys & Taylors Group of Harrogate, North Yorkshire for sustainable business success powered by stakeholder engagement and good values.
 The Co-operative Group of Manchester for approach to sustainable development.
 Crest Nicholson of Chertsey, Surrey for sustainable homes and community regeneration.
 Epsilon Technical Services of Chester for explosion prevention safety services including ATEX certification and CE marking.
 Fibercore of Southampton, Hampshire for implementation of a worldwide cost effective sustainability programme.
 Seacourt Limited of Oxford for development of a strategy to reduce the environmental impact of a printing company.
 Yell of Reading, Berkshire for a fully integrated leadership and management approach.

2006 
The following organisations were awarded this year.

 Eco Arc: Ecological Architecture Practice of York for design of low energy, sustainable buildings relying on renewable energy
 North of England Zoological Society (Chester Zoo) of Chester for contributions to conservation, education and sustainability
 Sawdays Travel of Long Ashton, Bristol for reduction of carbon emissions.
 ScottishPower Renewables of Glasgow, Scotland for sustainable best practice in windfarm development.
 Shepherd Neame of Faversham, Kent for management of a brewery and public houses in Kent and South East England.
 Traidcraft of Gateshead, Tyne and Wear for promotion of fair trade, ethical business practices, social accounting and stakeholder engagement.
 Yeo Valley Farms (Production) Ltd of Blagdon, Bristol for their approach to management with continuing support for sustainable UK organic farming thereby minimising environmental impact.

2005 
The following organisations were awarded this year.

 Abel & Cole of London SE24 for  Development of a socially responsible home delivery business.
 Adnams of Southwold, Suffolk for  Values-based approach to business management.
 Best Foot Forward Limited of Oxford for  Use of ecological footprint analysis to inform management decision-making.
 Clinton Devon Estates of Budleigh Salterton, Devon for  Radical business integration of resources for managing a complex countryside business.
 Country Lanes of Fordingbridge, Hampshire for  Cycle tourism specialist providing day trips, short breaks and longer holidays.
 Global Tea & Commodities of London SE16 for  Vertically integrated tea, coffee and macadamia nut supply chain.
 Renewable Energy Systems Group of Kings Langley, Hertfordshire for  Development, construction and operation of renewable energy generation sites.
 The Venus Company of Stoke Fleming, Dartmouth, for Devon Business mission to be the leading ‘green’ beach cafe´ and shop operator in Europe.

2004

2003 
The following organisations were awarded this year.

 BT Group of London EC1 for The BT programme for sustainable development.
 Beacon Print t/a The Beacon Press of Uckfield, East Sussex for Development of environmental procedures.
 Feilden Clegg Bradley Studios of Bath for Sustainable architecture and environmental research and innovation.
 Greenham Common Community Trust of Newbury, Berkshire for A sustainable business park.
 J&G Environmental of Blandford Forum, Dorset for Reprographic waste collection service.
 Rockware Glass of Knottingley, West Yorkshire for Sustainability in glass packaging production through recycling, technology and educational programmes.
 Seabait Limited of Ashington, Northumberland for Culture worms (polychaeta) as bait and animal feeds.
 Seaview Hotel & Restaurant of Seaview, Isle of Wight for Hotel and restaurant.
 St Gemma’s Hospice of Leeds, West Yorkshire for Excellence in the management of hospice care leading to major improvements.
 Uniqema of Redcar, Cleveland for Emkarate RLrange of synthetic refrigeration lubricants.

2002 
The following organisations were awarded this year.

 Association of Chartered Certified Accountants of London WC2 for London WC2 An innovative social/environmental issues programme.
 The Co-operative Bank of Manchester for Manchester Partnership approach to management.
 Derwent Cumberland Pencil Company of Keswick, Cumbria for Keswick, Cumbria Solvent free paint application systems.
 Econnect Limited of Hexham, Northumberland for Hexham, Northumberland Grid integration of renewable energy.
 Interface Europe of Halifax for Halifax Sustainability vision and progress.
 Ormiston Wire of Isleworth, Middlesex for Isleworth, Middlesex Integration of sustainable development principles into corporate management.
 St George plc of Twickenham, Middlesex for Twickenham, Middlesex Residential-led mixed-use sustainable neighbourhoods on brownfield sites.
 Sustrans of Bristol for Bristol The National Cycle Network.
 Yell of Reading, Berkshire for Reading, Berkshire International directories including UK Yellow Pages.

2001 
The following organisations were awarded this year.

 B&Q of Eastleigh, Hampshire for QUEST (QUality, Ethics, SafeTy) programme.
 Bettys & Taylors Group of Harrogate, North Yorkshire for Holistic management of resources.
 Bovince of London E17 for Sustainability development programme.
 Buro Happold of Bath for Engineering sustainable buildings, with research and innovation reducing impact upon the built environment.
 Cooks’ Delight of Berkhamsted, Hertfordshire for Organic food.
 Cotswold Water Park Society of Cirencester, Gloucestershire for Sustainable recreation and conservation.
 Greenbanks Country Hotel & Restaurant of Wendling, Norfolk for  Exceptional facilities for disabled and able bodied to share.
 Kodak of Hemel Hempstead, for Hertfordshire Consistent improvement of environmental management system and procedures.
 Leeds Environmental Design Associates of Leeds for Sustainability in building design.
 The North of England Zoological Society of Chester for Chester Zoo revitalisation.
 Safeway of Hayes, Middlesex for Rail freight strategy.
 Scottish Power of Glasgow, Scotland for Gas reburn, cost effective NOx reduction technology.
 Southampton Geothermal Heating Company of Crawley, West Sussex for District energy network using combined heat and power and geothermal energy.
 Woking Borough Council of Woking, Surrey for Community energy systems.
 Yeo Valley Organic Company of Cannington, Somerset for Organic dairy supply chain.

References